Marlene Yvonne Terry is an American politician serving as a member of the Missouri House of Representatives from the 66th district. Elected in November 2020, she assumed office on January 5, 2020.

Early life and education 
Terry was born and raised in St. Louis. After graduating from University City High School, she attended the University of Missouri–St. Louis.

Career 
Terry has worked as an accounting clerk for BJC HealthCare. She also served as a member of the Riverview Gardens School Board for nine years. Terry was elected to the Missouri House of Representatives in 2020, placing first in the Democratic primary and running unopposed in the general election. She assumed office on January 5, 2021.

Electoral History

References 

Living people
Politicians from St. Louis
African-American state legislators in Missouri
Women state legislators in Missouri
Democratic Party members of the Missouri House of Representatives
Year of birth missing (living people)
21st-century African-American people
21st-century African-American women